Polacco is a surname. Notable people with the surname include:

Cesare Polacco (1900–1986), Italian actor and voice actor
Giorgio Polacco (1875–1960), Italian conductor
Patricia Polacco (born 1944), American author and illustrator

See also
Polanco (surname)

Italian-language surnames